Dmitry Ignatenko (born 1 February 1995) is a Belarusian professional footballer who plays for Slavia Mozyr.

External links
 
 
 Profile at Gomel website 

1995 births
Living people
Sportspeople from Gomel
Belarusian footballers
Association football defenders
FC Gomel players
FC Belshina Bobruisk players
FC Gorodeya players
FC Slavia Mozyr players